Mary Keller is the name of:

 Mary Kenneth Keller (1913–1985), computer scientist
 Mary Page Keller (born 1961), actress